Phallodrilinae is a subfamily of clitellate oligochaete worms.

Genera 
The following genera are currently accepted within the subfamily Phallodrilinae.

 Aberrantidrilus Martin, 2015
 Abyssidrilus Erséus, 1992
 Adelodrilus Cook, 1969
 Aktedrilus Knöllner, 1935
 Albanidrilus Erséus, 1992
 Atlantidrilus Erséus, 1982
 Bathydrilus Cook, 1970
 Bermudrilus Erséus, 1979
 Coralliodrilus Erséus, 1979
 Duridrilus Erséus, 1983
 Gianius Erséus, 1992
 Inanidrilus Erséus, 1979
 Inermidrilus Erséus, 1992
 Jamiesoniella Erséus, 1981
 Marionidrilus Erséus, 1992
 Mexidrilus Erséus, 1992
 Milliganius Erséus, 1992
 Mitinokuidrilus Takashima & Mawatari, 1998
 Nootkadrilus Baker, 1982
 Olavius Erséus, 1984
 Pacifidrilus Erséus, 1992
 Paraktedrilus Erséus, 1992
 Pectinodrilus Erséus, 1992
 Peosidriloides Erséus & Milligan, 1994
 Peosidrilus Baker & Erséus, 1979
 Phallodriloides Erséus, 1992
 Phallodrilus Pierantoni, 1902
 Pirodriloides Erséus, 1992
 Pirodrilus Erséus, 1992
 Pseudospiridion Erséus, 1992
 Somalidrilus Erséus, 1992
 Spiridion Knöllner, 1935
 Thalassodrilus Brinkhurst, 1963
 Uniporodrilus Erséus, 1979

References

Further reading
Diaz, Robert J., and Christer Erseus. "Habitat preferences and species associations of shallow-water marine Tubificidae (Oligochaeta) from the barrier reef ecosystems off Belize, Central America." Aquatic Oligochaete Biology V. Springer Netherlands, 1994. 93-105.
Giere, Olav, et al. "A comparative structural study on bacterial symbioses of Caribbean gutless Tubificidae (Annelida, Oligochaeta)." Acta zoologica 76.4 (1995): 281–290.
Dubilier, Nicole, Anna Blazejak, and Caroline Rühland. "Symbioses between bacteria and gutless marine oligochaetes." Molecular Basis of Symbiosis. Springer Berlin Heidelberg, 2006. 251–275.

Tubificina